Asapholytoceras is a lytoceratid ammonite, originally from the upper Lower Jurassic of southeastern Europe with high, compressed whorls and a sharp angle to the umbilical shoulder. The exposed suture has four primary lobes on either side; the internal dorsal lobe is not cruciform (i.e. shaped in a cross).

Asapholytoceras is included in the lytoceratid subfamily Megalytoceratinae, along with Metrolytoceras and Megalytoceras.

References

 

Jurassic ammonites
Ammonites of Europe
Toarcian life
Ammonitida genera
Lytoceratidae